Ethel Gertrude Swanbeck (October 15, 1893 – December 21, 1989) from Huron, Ohio was a former member of the Ohio House of Representatives. She was the first woman to serve eleven consecutive terms in the Ohio House from 1955 to 1976.

External links
Profile on the Ohio Ladies' Gallery website

References

1893 births
1989 deaths
Republican Party members of the Ohio House of Representatives
Women state legislators in Ohio
20th-century American politicians
20th-century American women politicians
People from Erie County, Ohio